Al-Shahaniya City is a city in Qatar, located in the municipality of its namesake, Al-Shahaniya.

Qatar's most notable camel racetrack, Al-Shahaniya Camel Racetrack, is situated in the city.

Etymology
Al-Shahaniya derives its name from a plant known locally as 'sheeh' which was valued for its anti-inflammatory effects. It is also spelled Al-Sheehaniya. The plant's Latin name is Artemisia inculta; it is an aromatic perennial that frequently grows in the Middle East and North Africa region but which is scarce in Qatar due to its unsuitable soils.

Geography
Al Shahaniya is situated in central Qatar. Nearby areas of interest include the village of Lehsiniya and the Al Dehailiyat Army Camp to the east, the village of Umm Leghab to the north-east and the village of Al Khurayb to the north.

The following areas are considered to be localities or extensions of Al-Shahaniya city:
Al Samriya, a village that hosts the Sheikh Faisal Bin Qassim Al Thani Museum.
Lebsayyer, also spelled Al Busayyir, a residential area south of the camel track.
Al Fara, a farming area named after the rawda (depression) it is situated in.
Al Braithat, a farming area named for its friable soil.
Mazraat Al-Shahaniya, a farming area.
Rawdat Al-Shahaniya, a rest-house located in a rawda.
Wadi Baheesh, a farming area situated in a wadi (dry river valley).

History
In J.G. Lorimer's Gazetteer of the Persian Gulf, Al-Shahaniya is described as a 'Bedouin camping ground' with a 35-feet deep masonry well yielding good water in 1908.

Administration

When free elections of the Central Municipal Council first took place in Qatar during 1999, Al-Shahaniya was designated the seat of constituency no. 24. It would remain the headquarters of constituency no. 24 for the next three consecutive elections until the fifth municipal elections in 2015, when it was made the headquarters of constituency no. 23. Also included in its constituency is Al Khurayb, Al Nasraniya, Umm Leghab, and Lehsiniya. In the inaugural municipal elections in 1999, Faleh Fahad Al-Hajri won the elections, receiving 54.2%, or 149 votes. Runner-up that year was Ali Mohammed Al Dossari, receiving 45.8%, or 126, of the votes. Voter turnout was 86.8%. Shaher Saud Al Shammari was elected in the 2002 elections. He retained his seat successfully in the next elections in 2007. In the 2011 elections, Mohamed Zafer Al-Hajri was elected as the constituent's representative. Al-Hajri retained his seat in the 2015 elections.

Infrastructure

A wide-scale public defense complex was inaugurated in 2010. Branches of various security organizations are hosted in the complex, such as the Dukhan Security Department. Two notable buildings in the complex are the Shahaniya Services Centre, which manages passports and travel documents and the Shahaniya Civil Defense Centre.

North of the public services complex, off Al Utouriya Road, is the municipal headquarters. Qatar's Ministry of Agriculture has set up an Agricultural Services Center in the city.

In April 2018, the Animal Production Research Station was established in the city by the Ministry of Municipality and Environment. Spanning roughly 78,000 square meters and constructed at a cost of QR 30 million, its facilities include a research station, animal sheds and a veterinary clinic.

Healthcare in the city is served by Al-Shahaniya Health Center. Among its facilities are a dental clinic, a radiology clinic, a women's clinic and a general clinic.

There are several labor camps in the vicinity of Al Shahaniya.

Industry
Natural gas and oil distribution pipelines and pumping stations are located in Al-Shahaniya City and several of its suburbs.

The Arab Qatari Agricultural Production Company was founded in 1989 in the city.

Roza Hassad opened Qatar's first large-scale flower-growing facility in Al-Shahaniya City in 2012. Flowers are grown hydroponically, and seventeen different species were planned to be grown at the time of its opening. Production in its 5,500 m2 (59,200 sq ft) greenhouse is mainly oriented towards roses. The company has established shops in Doha where it sells its locally produced flowers.

Sport
Qatar's main camel racetrack and camel training facilities are also located in Al-Shahaniya city. Robots are used to jockey the camels. One prominent competition that takes place on the track is the annual Founder Sheikh Jassim bin Mohammed bin Thani's Camel Festival.

Al Samariyah Equestrian Centre is located near the Sheikh Faisal Bin Qassim Al Thani Museum.

Visitor attractions
In 1979 Qatar's government portioned off a 12 km2 (4.6 sq mi) area of Al-Shahaniya as a sanctuary for Arabian oryxes, making it among the first protected environmental areas in the country. Oryxes for the reserve were transported from Muaither Farm by sheikh Abdulrahman bin Saud Al Thani. There were around 100 animals in te reserve in 1988. Aside from oryxes, there is an area of the reserve where red-necked ostriches are housed.

Sheikh Faisal Bin Qassim Al Thani Museum is a massive 530,000 m2 (5,7 million sq ft), 3-building museum established in Al-Shahaniya in 1998. It is located in Al Samriya, a locality of the city and is accessible through Dukhan Road.

Al-Shahaniya Park opened in 2014 over an area of around 26,000 m2 (280,000 sq ft). Facilities include a mosque, a football field, a volleyball court and a basketball court.

Gallery

References

Populated places in Al-Shahaniya
Cities in Qatar